Teenage Mutant Ninja Turtles II: The Secret of the Ooze is a 1991 American superhero film directed by Michael Pressman and written by Todd W. Langen. The sequel to Teenage Mutant Ninja Turtles (1990), it is the second installment in the 1990–1993 Teenage Mutant Ninja Turtles series. The film stars Paige Turco and David Warner with the voices of Brian Tochi, Robbie Rist, Adam Carl, and Laurie Faso.

The film follows the adventures of the four Turtles, Leonardo, Donatello, Michelangelo, Raphael, and their Master Splinter. Resuming from the events of the last film, the villain, the Shredder, returns to take back command of the Foot Clan, and work towards getting revenge on the Turtles. When he learns the secret behind the Turtles' mutation, he becomes more dangerous than ever. The film sheds some light on the origins of Splinter and the Turtles, as well as introduces two new villains, Tokka and Rahzar. Unlike the first film, it differs in the use of the Turtles' weapons. They instead fight bare-fisted for much of this film, as part of an attempt to tone down the violence of the previous installment.

The film was released theatrically in the United States on March 22, 1991, by New Line Cinema. It received mixed reviews from critics, who felt it departed from the much darker tone of the original 1990 film. However, it was financially successful, grossing $78.7 million against a budget of $20 million, becoming the thirteenth highest-grossing film domestically in the year of its release. The film is dedicated to Jim Henson, who died less than a year before this film's release. Henson's Creature Shop created the animatronic creature costumes for the film, like the first film.

A sequel, Teenage Mutant Ninja Turtles III, was released in 1993.

Plot

In New York City, a young pizza delivery boy named Keno inadvertently encounters burglars on his route and tries to stop them. The burglars attack Keno, who proves to be a skilled martial artist, but he is soon overwhelmed before the arrival of the Teenage Mutant Ninja Turtles. They vanish after rescuing Keno, tying the burglars up, and taking the pizza he was delivering, leaving behind the money to pay for it.

Leonardo, Donatello, Michelangelo and Raphael, along with their master Splinter, are currently living with April O'Neil while looking for a new place to live following the events of their last adventure. Splinter wants to remain in the shadows, while Raphael thinks they should live out in the open. At a junkyard where the remnants of The Foot and The Shredder's second-in-command Tatsu are hiding out, they are met by their master, who has been disfigured by his previous defeat and vows revenge on the Turtles.

April interviews Professor Jordan Perry of Techno Global Research Industries (TGRI) about a possible toxic waste leak. He assures her that everything is fine, but their scientists secretly discover dandelions which have been mutated by the leak. Freddy, a spy for the Foot posing as April's cameraman, discovers this and reports it to his master, who decides to have Perry interrogated. Back at April's apartment, Splinter reveals to her and the Turtles that the canister of mutagen (dubbed "Ooze" by the Turtles) which mutated them 15 years prior was created by TGRI, and they too decide to talk to Perry. The Foot gets to Perry first and kidnaps him, salvaging the last canister of ooze in the process. The Turtles attempt to get the canister back, but ultimately fail. Afterward, Keno gets into April's apartment under the guise of delivering pizza and discovers Splinter and the Turtles.

At the Shredder's hideout, Perry is forced to use the remaining ooze on a snapping turtle and a wolf, which mutate into Tokka and Rahzar, respectively. With the imminent threat to April's safety by the Foot, the Turtles start to actively look for a new home. After an argument with Leonardo, Raphael breaks off from the group, while Michelangelo discovers the abandoned City Hall subway station and deems it a perfect hideout. Raphael and Keno defy Splinter's orders and implant Keno into the Foot Clan to find their hideout. However, they are caught and Raphael is captured, while Keno escapes to warn the others. When they come, they are ambushed by the Shredder and the Foot; Splinter saves the group, but leaves as they face Tokka and Rahzar, who prove too strong to defeat. Donatello finds a bound and gagged Perry after being tossed into a building by Tokka, and the five of them make a tactical retreat. Once back in their hideout, Perry explains that the creation of the ooze was an accident, disheartening Donatello, Leonardo and Raphael, who saw a higher purpose for their existence.

The Shredder unleashes Tokka and Rahzar into a nearby neighborhood to cause damage. The next day, Freddy sends a message to April that Tokka and Rahzar will be released into Central Park if the Turtles don't meet the Foot Clan at the construction site. Perry develops an antidote to the mutations, but it must be ingested to work. When the Turtles confront the Foot at the site, they try using donuts to trick Tokka and Rahzar into eating the antidote. They discover the trick and brutally attack, throwing Raphael into a public dance club where Vanilla Ice is performing. A big fight ensues among hundreds of witnesses and eventually the Turtles revert Tokka and Rahzar back to their natural state. The Turtles fight with Shredder on the dock, who has transformed into a Super Shredder after consuming the last of the ooze. The heavily-mutated Super Shredder is too strong for the Turtles to fight, but is defeated when he rips the dock apart in his rampage, causing it to collapse onto him.

In a press release, April reads a note from Perry, thanking the Turtles for saving him. When they return home, the Turtles deny being seen by the humans, but Splinter holds up the evening's newspaper on which they are front-page news. He then orders the four of them to do 10 flips as punishment.

Cast

Live action
 Paige Turco as April O'Neil, a news reporter, and the human companion of the Turtles and Splinter. Turco replaced Judith Hoag for this film and the following film. According to Hoag, she was not approached to reprise the role because the producers thought she complained too much during the first movie about the strenuous shooting schedule and amount of violence.
 David Warner as Professor Jordan Perry, a scientist who works for the TGRI company as head scientist. He works with the Turtles to create an antidote for the mutated Tokka and Rahzar.
 Ernie Reyes Jr. as Keno, a pizza delivery boy, and martial arts expert who meets the turtles in the beginning of the film and befriends them. Reyes was the in-suit performer and stunt double for Donatello in the previous film.
 François Chau as The Shredder, the Turtles and Splinter arch-nemesis who survived the battle with Splinter from the first film, and wishes to get revenge on Splinter and the Turtles. François Chau replaced James Saito in this film.
 Kevin Nash as Super Shredder, a mutated version of Shredder.
 Toshishiro Obata as Tatsu, Shredder's right-hand man and temporary leader of the Foot Clan in Shredder's absence.
 Mark Doerr as Freddy, a Foot Clan member who poses as April's camera operator.
 Michael Pressman as News Manager
 Vanilla Ice as himself

Michael Jai White makes an uncredited cameo as an audience member that joins the Foot Clan with Keno.

Voice cast
 Brian Tochi as Leonardo: the leader of the Turtles. He wears a blue bandana and carries two ninjaken on the back of his shell.
 Robbie Rist as Michelangelo: the most light-hearted of the Turtles. He wears an orange bandana and carries dual nunchaku on each side within his belt.
 Adam Carl as Donatello: the brains of the Turtles and is known for his technological expertise and joining in with Michelangelo on their jokes and pratfalls. He wears a purple bandana and carries a bo on the back of his shell. Carl replaced Corey Feldman as the voice of Donnie for this film.
 Laurie Faso as Raphael: the more aggressive and rebellious of the Turtles. He wears a red bandana and carries two sai in his belt, Troum and Faso replace Josh Pais in this film.
 Kevin Clash as Splinter: a wise mutant rat who is the master and father figure of the turtles.
 David McCharen as Oroku Saki/the Shredder
 Michael McConnohie as Tatsu
 Frank Welker as Tokka and Rahzar: a mutated alligator snapping turtle and a mutated wolf created by Professor Perry under orders from the Shredder using a canister of ooze stolen from the TGRI company.

Puppeteers
 Mark Caso as Leonardo (in-suit performer)
 Rob Tygner as Leonardo (facial assistant)
 Larry Lam as Leonardo (in-suit martial arts stunt double)
 Michelan Sisti as Michelangelo (in-suit performer)
 Mak Wilson as Michelangelo (facial assistant)
 Nick Palma as Michelangelo (in-suit martial arts stunt double)
 Leif Tilden as Donatello (in-suit performer)
 Rob Mills as Donatello (facial assistant)
 Steven Ho as Donatello (in-suit martial arts stunt double)
 Kenn Troum as Raphael (in-suit performer)
 David Greenaway as Raphael (facial assistant)
 Hosung Pak as Raphael (in-suit martial arts stunt double)
 Kevin Clash as Splinter (puppeteer)
 Rickey Boyd as Splinter (assistant puppeteer)
 Sue Dacre as Splinter (assistant puppeteer)
 Mark Ginther as Rahzar (in-suit performer)
 Gord Robertson as Rahzar (facial assistant)
 Hamilton Perkins as Rahzar (in-suit stunt double)
 Kurt Bryant as Tokka (in-suit performer)
 Rick Lyon as Tokka (facial assistant)
 David Rowden as Tokka (in-suit stunt double)

Production
Due to the massive success of the first film, it was generally expected that a sequel would follow. The film was produced on a budget of US$25 million, nearly twice the budget of the 1990 film, which was $13.5 million. Like the first film, New Line Cinema distributed The Secret of the Ooze. Both the voice actors of Michaelangelo and Leonardo reprised their roles in the second film, while Corey Feldman did not voice Donatello in the second movie after pleading no contest to a drug possession charge in December 1990. Also, a different actress was cast for the role of April O'Neil, with Paige Turco replacing Judith Hoag from the first film. The character of Casey Jones, who was prominent in the first movie, did not appear here (though he did return in the following movie). Ernie Reyes Jr., who was Donatello's fight double in the first film, was cast as a new character, Keno, as the producers admired Reyes and his performance in the first movie so much they asked him to join the sequel. Todd W. Langen returned from the first film to write the screenplay.

The characters of Bebop and Rocksteady, which were popular villains in the 1987 animated series, could not be used due to Kevin Eastman and Peter Laird objecting, with the latter stating that "their constant one-note shtick in the first animated series [was] extremely annoying and silly to the point of being stupid.” As a result, Tokka and Rahzar were created. The abandoned subway station, which serves as the new lair for the Turtles, is based on the real-life decommissioned  City Hall station of the New York City Subway, built by the former Interborough Rapid Transit Company. The station is not completely abandoned, as it appears in the movie. Trains pass through the station daily as they turn around to head uptown, passengers are allowed to ride through the station, but the train does not stop and so they cannot disembark. During filming of the scene where the Turtles are trapped in the net and fall to the ground, one of the stuntmen broke an ankle. Some filming took place in North Carolina, much like the first, where the New York City skyline was created at the North Carolina Film Studios. The building used for the entrance to April's apartment is the office of the New York location of Jim Henson's Creature Shop, which did the animatronics work for the film as well as its predecessor. The film is dedicated to the memory of Jim Henson, who had died the previous May. This made it the first movie dedicated to Henson, the second being The Muppet Christmas Carol (1992). This is also the first TMNT film to include a dedication; the second would be TMNT, which was dedicated to the late Mako, the voice actor for Splinter in that film.

Music

An original motion picture soundtrack was released alongside the film in 1991 by SBK Records.

The soundtrack featured 10 tracks from the film, and music from artists such as Magnificent V11 produced by Troy Duncombe and Mickey Mahoney of Cat and Moose productions Ya Kid K, Cathy Dennis and David Morales, Tribal House and Dan Hartman. The most famous song featured on the soundtrack was "Ninja Rap" performed by rapper Vanilla Ice.

The song featured prominently within the feature film, as Ice makes an appearance as himself, and begins to freestyle a ninja rap song when the turtles end up fighting Tokka and Rahzar within the club where he was performing. In terms of the plot, this song was to trick the audience into believing the fight was a harmless "show" and thus not to panic.

A music video was also produced for "Ninja Rap" at the time of the film's release. The soundtrack also features two original pieces from the Orchestra On the Half Shell. The original music was composed by John Du Prez, who won a BMI Film Music Award for his work.

Release

Home media
The film was originally released on VHS in North America on July 31, 1991. It sold 5 million units.

The film was later released to DVD in Region 1 on 3 September 2002; it contained only minor special features and interactive menus.

On 4 August 2009, the film was included in a special 25th-anniversary boxset, released to both DVD and Blu-ray formats. It contains Teenage Mutant Ninja Turtles, Teenage Mutant Ninja Turtles II, Teenage Mutant Ninja Turtles III, and the animated release, TMNT (2007).

Reception

Box office

The Secret of the Ooze was released in theatres on March 22, 1991, in the United States, and subsequently in other countries from June through to August. The film was number one in North America on its first weekend of release, taking in over US$20 million, and eventually making $78,656,813 in total, generating theatrical rentals of $41.9 million. The film was a success at the U.S. and Canadian box office, but made less than the first film, becoming the second highest-grossing independent film ever, behind the original. Overseas, the film did not do so well, with 20th Century Fox acquiring the foreign rights for $25 million but the film only earning them rentals of $12 million. In total, the film had worldwide rentals of $54 million. Some fans noted that there was also a reduction in the use of weapons by the turtles in the film, perhaps due to violence in the first film. (Leonardo and Raphael only use their weapons once each in the movie, for example.)

Like its predecessor, the second Teenage Mutant Ninja Turtles installment was censored in the UK due to usage of forbidden weapons (the nunchaku), most notably during the opening credits sequence where Michelangelo imitates their use by swinging a pair of sausages. The edits were waived for the DVD release in 2002. The German version was not censored visually; as with the first film, funny cartoon sound effects were added to the fight scenes to soften the violence.

Critical response
The second film received mixed reviews from critics. On Rotten Tomatoes, the film has a rating of 35% based on reviews from 43 critics, with the consensus: "Not only is the movie's juvenile dialogue unbearable for adults, but the turtles' dopey and casual attitude towards physical violence makes them poor kids' role models". On Metacritic, the film has a score of 45 out of 100 based on reviews from 20 critics, indicating "mixed or average reviews".

Dave Kehr of The Chicago Sun Times calls the film "a fast, funny, engagingly unpretentious 88 minutes that, moving between martial-arts dustups and random satirical jibes, achieves a more successful mix of action and humor than the first. There is plenty for adults here as well as children".

Janet Maslin of The New York Times notes that "the Turtles fight less, clown more and stray too far from their beloved sewers" and calls it an improvement, and is relieved that they have at least made a mainstream movie. Maslin stated that the Turtles "clean up their act" in the movie and also praised Secret of the Ooze for containing scenes referencing then-growing popular culture trends which were considered major competitors to the TMNT franchise's "greatest assets," such as rap music and Bart Simpson.  Lloyd Bradley of Empire Magazine gave the film three out of five stars, saying, "This lacks the darkness and subtlety that makes the first film so good, and so adult, but its simplified plot and gags will appeal to the under tens".

Gene Siskel at The Chicago Tribune was just as unimpressed by this film as the first, calling it "a martial-arts movie in rubber uniforms". Siskel considers that he is an adult "forgetting the sort of mindless entertainment that he himself enjoyed as a child" but rejects the idea and calls the fight scenes "more depressing than joyful". Roger Ebert of The Chicago Sun Times complains that the Turtles look essentially the same, and suggests they are an "emblem of our drab and dreary times" and that they are "an example of the hazards of individuality". He says kids are getting a bad deal and compared to the comic book heroes he grew up with they are being robbed of "a sense of wonder".

Toys 
The Teenage Mutant Ninja Turtles franchise was arguably at the height of its popularity around the time that The Secret of the Ooze was released in theatres. A number of tie-ins were brought out alongside the release of the film. A new line of toys were introduced for the release of the film, including "Movie Star" toys of all four turtles, with the box art depicting stills from the film, as well as a cartoon rendition of the turtles gathered around a canister of ooze in the top right corner of the package. In contrast to the usual Turtles' figures, the film series figures were softer and more rubbery, to better reflect the look of the animatronic costumes used in the films. They also featured ball joints at the neck, shoulders, and hips, and each figure came with a small, plastic canister with a sticker of "Ooze" wrapped around them. An official film adaptation was also released by Eastman and Laird.

Figurines of Super Shredder, Tokka and Rahzar were also available, though they were not as closely aligned to the film as the four turtles were. The Playmates company produced the figurines. The Turtles franchise had by now also immersed itself into the food industry, with characters from the franchise appearing on numerous food products. Royal Gelatin Desserts adapted the "Ooze" name into their product, and featured the Turtles on the packages. The boxes 
included various recipes involving ooze in some form.

Sequel 

A third film, titled Teenage Mutant Ninja Turtles III, was released 1993 to a smaller box office take and is the last of the original trilogy of films.

References

External links

 
 
 
 

1991 films
1990s English-language films
1991 action comedy films
1990s science fiction comedy films
1990s superhero comedy films
1990s superhero films
1990s teen films
1991 independent films
1991 martial arts films
20th Century Fox films
American action comedy films
American independent films
American sequel films
Fictional portrayals of the New York City Police Department
Films about the New York City Police Department
American films about revenge
Films based on American comics
Films directed by Michael Pressman
Films scored by John Du Prez
Live-action films based on comics
Films set in New York City
Films shot in New York City
Films set in New Jersey
Films shot in North Carolina
Golden Harvest films
Hong Kong action comedy films
Hong Kong independent films
Hong Kong sequel films
Martial arts comedy films
Martial arts science fiction films
New Line Cinema films
Ninja films
Slapstick films
Teenage Mutant Ninja Turtles (1990 film series)
Secret of the Ooze
1990s American films